Pseudocharacium is a genus of green algae in the family Ignatiaceae.

References

Ulvophyceae
Ulvophyceae genera